Severe Tropical Cyclone Funa was the second strongest tropical cyclone during the 2007–08 South Pacific cyclone season, causing heavy flood and wind damage to areas of Vanuatu. The third tropical cyclone and second severe tropical cyclone of the season to form to the west of 160°E, Funa formed from an area of disturbed weather within the monsoon trough northeast of Vanuatu on January 16, 2008. Steadily intensifying as it moved to the east and subsequently south, Funa reached peak intensity with 10-minute sustained winds of 175 km/h (110 mph). However, the cyclone encountered unfavorable conditions as it progressed further south, before transitioning into an extratropical cyclone on 
January 21.

Cyclone Funa severely affected areas of Vanuatu, especially to the island chain's infrastructure. Regions of the coast were also inundated by sea flooding caused by strong storm surge associated with Funa. Offshore, the cruise ship Pacific Star sustained heavy damage from the cyclone's strong waves. The cyclone's remnants later caused strong winds in New Zealand, resulting in power outages and fires.

Meteorological history

During January 15, the Fiji Meteorological Service (FMS) reported that Tropical Disturbance 10F, had developed within a monsoon trough of low pressure, that extended from northern Australia, through northern Vanuatu and to the north of Fiji. At this stage, atmospheric convection flared around the system's broad and developing low level circulation centre, while the system was located within an area of moderate vertical wind shear. Over the next day, vertical wind shear surrounding the system relaxed, while atmospheric convection wrapped into the disturbances rapidly consolidating low level circulation centre. As a result, the JTWC initiated advisories on the system and designated it as Tropical Cyclone 12P, while the FMS reported that the system had intensified into a category 1 tropical cyclone on the Australian tropical cyclone intensity scale and named it Funa.

The storm then moved into TCWC Wellington area of responsibility it started to weaken and then became extratropical the next day with the JTWC issuing their final advisory on January 20, with TCWC Wellington downgrading it to a low later that day.

Preparations and impact
Severe damage occurred over the groups of islands in the Torba, Sanma, and Penama provinces of Vanuatu, particularly on dwellings (made of local material), trees, and crops. Over the Banks Islands, coastal villages were reported to have been inundated by sea flooding, including in Maewo. On Mota Lava and Rah Island, as well as Gaua, bungalows, resorts, and restaurants along the coast were either washed away or inundated by sea flooding, according to their provincial council reports. Most schools in the Torba and Penama provinces sustained major damages to classrooms and other semi-permanent structures, while other buildings had their roofs ripped off. There were no reports of any fatalities but minor casualties were confirmed.

On January 19, a cruise ship, the Pacific Star, encountered 7 metre (22.9 ft) waves produced by Funa. Numerous windows were broken on the ship as it was tossed around by the waves. Water poured into passengers rooms through broken windows, causing panic throughout the ship. Five people were injured, one of whom sustained a broken rib after falling out of bed when a wave hit the ship. The bar area of the ship was reportedly significantly damaged and dishes and glasses were shattered in the kitchen.

The remnants of Funa produced high winds in the North Island of New Zealand which knocked down numerous trees, cutting power to 16,000 residents on the island. Downed power lines sparked several fires. Waves up to 5 m (16.4 ft) impacted coastal regions of New Zealand, forcing boaters to remain in port. Upwards of 300 mm (11.8 in) of rain fell across parts of New Zealand and gale-force winds fanned brushfires.

The World Meteorological Organization's RA V Tropical Cyclone Committee later retired the name Funa from the South Pacific naming lists and replaced it with Fotu.

See also 

 List of South Pacific cyclone seasons
 2007–08 South Pacific cyclone season
 Cyclone Guba
 Timeline of the 2007–08 South Pacific cyclone season

References

External links

Tropical cyclones in New Zealand
Tropical cyclones in Vanuatu
Funa
Cyclone Funa
Retired South Pacific cyclones
Category 4 South Pacific cyclones
Funa